Sarita Pérez de Tagle (born October 29, 1986 in Manila, Philippines) is a Filipina cinema and television actress. She was launched as a member of Star Circle Batch 11, a group of talents managed by the ABS-CBN Talent Center (now known as Star Magic) in 2003.

Personal life
She is the third of six children in a Filipino family of Spanish descent. Daughter of actor Bernie Pérez; she is the granddaughter of singer and actress Sylvia La Torre, and also the cousin of actress Anna Maria Perez de Tagle. She is also the distant niece of Isabel Preysler and distant cousin of Enrique Iglesias, Chabeli Iglesias and Julio Iglesias Jr.

She graduated AB Psychology at the De La Salle University in 2005.

Early career
Sarita appeared in the TV series It Might Be You on ABS-CBN, and in the movies My First Romance (2003) and D' Anothers (2005).

References

External links
 

1986 births
Filipino child actresses
Filipino film actresses
Living people
People from Muntinlupa
Actresses from Metro Manila
Star Magic